Michael Frederick Krol (born May 19, 1984) is an American musician and graphic designer based in Los Angeles, California. After releasing two albums on Counter Counter Culture, Krol released his third album Turkey on Merge Records August 28, 2015. Power Chords was released in 2019, described by Dagger as "hit[ting] a nerve here with some real classic catchy, garage rock."

Discography 

Studio albums
 I Hate Jazz (Counter Counter Culture, 2011)
 Trust Fund (Counter Counter Culture, 2013)
 Turkey (Merge Records, 2015)
Power Chords (Merge Records, 2019)

Singles/EPs
 Live At Vera (Roekie Records, 2016)
 An Ambulance B/W Never Know (Merge Records, 2018)

Compilations
 Mike Krol Is Never Dead: The First Two Records (Merge Records, 2017)
 Dog Songs (2017), "Beethoven (Beethoven)"
 You Wish: A Merge Records Holiday Album (Merge Records, 2019), "Won't Be Alone Tonight"

Other media
Merge Records announced that Krol's music would be making an appearance on Cartoon Network's Steven Universe. His name, image, and songs "Like a Star" and "Fifteen Minutes" were prominently featured on the sixth episode of the fourth season, "Last One Out of Beach City". In 2019 he co-wrote and produced the song "Disobedient" for the soundtrack of Steven Universe: The Movie.

Krol wrote and recorded a song for the Cartoon Network short Jammers.

Krol recorded the song "The World's Gonna End" for an online video by entertainment company Super Deluxe.

The song "Fifteen Minutes" is also used as the credits song to the dating sim Monster Prom, where it’s only heard when playing the non-dlc game mode.

The song "La La La" was used in a television advertisement for Levi's.

Mike has also grown a modest following for his music online, with most notable additions being his subreddit r/mikekrol and the fan Discord Server which, in May 2021, released a fan-made cover of I Hate Jazz called "We Hate Jazz".

References

External links
 Official website
 Record company profile
 Bandcamp profile

Living people
20th-century American Jews
Musicians from Milwaukee
Merge Records artists
1984 births
21st-century American Jews